The 2008 Portuguese motorcycle Grand Prix was the third round of the 2008 MotoGP Championship. It took place on the weekend of 11–13 April 2008 at the Autódromo do Estoril located in Estoril, Portugal.

This race would mark the first start in Grand Prix motorcycle racing for future multiple time MotoGP champion Marc Márquez. Márquez had entered the previous round at Jerez, but withdrew before the race began.

MotoGP classification

250 cc classification

125 cc classification

Championship standings after the race (MotoGP)

Below are the standings for the top five riders and constructors after round three has concluded. 

Riders' Championship standings

Constructors' Championship standings

 Note: Only the top five positions are included for both sets of standings.

References

Portuguese motorcycle Grand Prix
Portuguese
Motorcycle Grand Prix